New Monkees is the name of both an American pop rock music group and a 1987 syndicated television show featuring the group.

Overview

Background
The 20th anniversary of The Monkees TV series in 1986 generated enough interest that New Monkees, a full reboot of the earlier series with none of the original members of The Monkees involved, was conceived later that year, and launched the following year. The show was distributed by LBS Communications in association with Coca-Cola Telecommunications. Straybert Productions, headed by Steve Blauner (a former partner of original Monkees producers Robert Rafelson and Bert Schneider), served as the project's producers.

The group's members were Jared Chandler (guitar and vocals), Dino Kovas (drums and vocals), Marty Ross (bass and vocals), and Larry Saltis (lead guitar and vocals).  As it had been with the original Monkees, each had to pass a grueling set of auditions. Unlike the previous series, however, musical ability was a key factor in the selection process. Ross, a multi-instrumentalist, had earlier been signed to CBS Records, with his former band The Wigs.

Revived interest
On November 11, 2017, all four New Monkees attended a 30-year reunion organized by Amy Collen. They were interviewed for the podcast Deep Dish Radio with Tim Powers, and performed a few songs. On February 16, 2019, the New Monkees performed a sold-out concert at the Pig 'n Whistle restaurant and bar in Los Angeles, organized by Jodi Ritzen; the concert featured an appearance by the original Monkees' Micky Dolenz.

Cast
Larry Saltis - Larry
Jared Chandler - Jared
Dino Kovas - Dino
Marty Ross - Marty
Gordon Oas-Heim - Manford
Lynnie Godfrey - Helen
Bess Motta- Rita the Waitress

List of episodes

Stations
The New Monkees was distributed to independent stations and network affiliates by Colex Enterprises, a joint venture of Columbia Pictures Television and LBS Communications Inc.

Album

New Monkees - Warner Bros. Records (released 1987)

Track listing:
Side 1:
 "What I Want" (Eddie Schwartz/David Tyson)
 "Do It Again" (Julia Downes/John Parr)
 "I Don't Know" (Michael Cruz)
 "The Way She Moves" (Denis Keldie)
 "Boy Inside the Man" (Tom Cochrane)

Side 2:
 "Burnin' Desire" (Rob Elvis)
 "Whatever It Takes" (Alan Roy Scott/Arnie Roman)
 "Affection" (Ken Brown)
 "Carlene" (Greg Barnhill/Gene Houston/Johnny Hozey/Derrell Brown)
 "Corner of My Eye" (Larry Saltis/Mike Slamer/Charlie Mitchell)
 "Turn It Up" (Joe Curiale/Jimmy Haddox)

Single (45 RPM)
Warner Bros. Records (released 1987)

Track listing:
 "What I Want" (Side A)
 "Turn It Up" (Side B)

Other songs
In addition to the songs featured on the album, the New Monkees recorded several songs for the TV series that ultimately did not see an official release:
 "Clone of My Own"
 "One of the Boys"
 "Affection" (acoustic version)
 "Late Night"
 "I Can't Forget"
 "Follow Your Heart"
 "Maybe Tonight"
 "Won't Let You Lose Me"
 "Catch 22"
 "Someday Someway"
 "Crazy"
 "Searchin'"
 "Squeeze Play"
 "If I Needed Someone"
 "You Say You Will (And You Mean You Won't)"
 "If You Don't Go Away"
 "I'm Gonna Miss You This Summer"

Yulesville By Various Artists (Warner Bros. Records)
B8 "What I Want (For Christmas)"

References

External links
 
Official Facebook Page
Turn it up: An oral history of the forgotten New Monkees
Hey, what ever happened to the New Monkees?

1987 American television series debuts
1987 American television series endings
1980s American sitcoms
American pop rock music groups
The Monkees
Television series based on singers and musicians
Television series created by Victor Fresco
Television series by Sony Pictures Television
First-run syndicated television programs in the United States
English-language television shows
American sequel television series
Television series reboots